The 1926 Rose Bowl Game was held on January 1, 1926, in Pasadena, California. The game is commonly referred to as "The Game That Changed The South." The game featured the Alabama Crimson Tide, making their first bowl appearance, and the Washington Huskies.

The Crimson Tide was led by Johnny Mack Brown, and the Huskies by George "Wildcat" Wilson.

Alabama were victorious 20–19, as they scored all 20 points in the third quarter. With the victory, the Crimson Tide were awarded with their first National Championship.

The game made its radio broadcast debut, with Charles Paddock, a sports writer and former Olympian track star, at the microphone. Coach Wade was later inducted into the Rose Bowl Hall of Fame in 1990.

Johnny Mack Brown went on to a long career as a movie actor, mostly in westerns.


Team selection
The Rose Bowl committee extended an invitation to Clark Shaughnessy's Tulane team, but the school administration declined the offer because it did not want to sacrifice academics to play a football game.

Scoring

First quarter
Wash – Paton, 1-yard run (Guttormsen kick failed)

Second quarter
Wash – Cole, 20-yard pass from Wilson (Guttormsen kick failed)

Third quarter
Ala – Hubert, 1-yard run (Buckler kick good)
Ala – Brown, 59-yard pass from Gillis (Buckler kick good)
Ala – Brown, 30-yard pass from Hubert (Buckler kick failed)

Fourth quarter
Wash – Guttormsen, 27-yard pass from Wilson (Cook kick good)

References

External links

 The Will To Win, Alabama East-West Champions by Champ Pickens, 1926 from the University Libraries Division of Special Collections, The University of Alabama

1925–26 NCAA football bowl games
1926
1926
1926
1926 in sports in California
January 1926 sports events